Sheila Galvin (23 February 1914 – 20 March 1983) was an Irish Fianna Fáil politician. She was elected to Dáil Éireann as a Fianna Fáil Teachta Dála (TD) for the Cork Borough constituency at the February 1964 by election caused by the death of her husband John Galvin. She did not contest the 1965 general election.

See also
Families in the Oireachtas

References

1914 births
1983 deaths
Fianna Fáil TDs
Members of the 17th Dáil
20th-century women Teachtaí Dála
Politicians from County Cork
Spouses of Irish politicians